Hart Street is a small street in the City of London.

The name is believed to have been a variation on hearth, which were constructed and sold here during the Middle Ages. The Lord Mayor of London, Richard Whittington was once believed to have lived on this street, but this has since been debunked.

St Olave's on Hart Street was the parish church of Samuel Pepys. The Ship at No. 3 Hart Street opened in 1887, and has been a Grade II listed building since 1972.

References

Streets in the City of London